Odostomia boermani is a species of sea snail, a marine gastropod mollusc in the family Pyramidellidae, the pyrams and their allies.

Description
The shell size varies between 2.4 mm and 2.7 mm.

Distribution
This species occurs in the southeast North Atlantic off Mauritania.

References

External links
 
 To Encyclopedia of Life
 To World Register of Marine Species

boermani
Gastropods described in 1998
Invertebrates of West Africa